Kardar is a village in Sirik Rural District, Byaban District, Minab County, Hormozgan Province, Iran. At the 2006 census, its population was 466, in 67 families.

References 

Populated places in Minab County